This Just In is a phrase used by news anchors when an important piece of news has just arrived while on the air. It may also refer to:
 This Just In: What I Couldn't Tell You on TV, a 2003 book written by Bob Schieffer
 This Just In!, a 2004 American animated television series shown on Spike TV
 This Just In, the working title of a 2007 television news satire show to air on Fox News now named The Half Hour News Hour
 This Just In (2016 TV series), an American comedy television series
 This Just In with Max Kellerman, an American sports talk television show on ESPN